Children of Telepathic Experiences is the debut album by the Australian band Gerling. The album was released in 1998 on Reliant, a now-defunct imprint of Festival Mushroom Records.

At the ARIA Music Awards of 1999, the album was nominated for Best Adult Alternative Album and Breakthrough Artist - Album.

Production
The record was co-produced by the band, in collaboration with Steve Foster, who would also work with the band on its next album.

Track listing
"The Last Traveller"  – 3:07
"Death To The Apple Gerls"  – 3:35
"Enter, Space Capsule"  – 3:29
"Destructor 4000"  – 2:36
"Ghost Patrol"  – 3:39
"Suburban Jungle Sleeping Bag"  – 3:25
"Meet You @ Karate"  – 3:03
"Crafted Werked"  – 2:55
"I Heard an Echo of a Cobra's Bite"  – 4:58
"Art School Canyon"  – 3:36
"√ Genius Fight"  – 2:46
"Bachelor Pad, Pt. 1"  – 2:59
"Bachelor Pad, Pt. 2"  – 4:23
"Linsky"  – 0:59
"A Student Eating Sushi with a Chimp on a Glass Island"  – 4:07
"Enter, Space Capsule" (Radio Disko Remix)  - 3:17

References 

1998 debut albums
Gerling albums
Festival Records albums